Melese leucanioides is a moth of the family Erebidae. It was described by Gottlieb August Wilhelm Herrich-Schäffer in 1856. It is found in Colombia.

References

 

Melese
Moths described in 1856